Emily Afton (born January 26, 1985) is an American singer and actress known for her roles in the Original Broadway Cast of Amélie, Broadway and National Tour casts of Hair, and National Tour of Priscilla, Queen of the Desert. In 2015, she played Pattie in the STAGES St. Louis production of Smokey Joe's Cafe. In 2017, she performed with the Broadway’s Future Songbook Series featuring the work of Michael Finke.

She performs as lead female vocalist for the bands Saved by the 90s and The Little Mermen.

Theatre credits

References

External links 
 
 
 
 
 
 

American musical theatre actresses
American stage actresses
American women singers
1985 births
Living people
21st-century American women
Emerson College alumni